The Democratic Alliance of National Revolution (Spanish: Alianza Democrática de la Revolución Nacional, ADRN) was a centrist electoral political alliance in Bolivia.

The ADRN was formed in 1978 by 
the Nationalist Revolutionary Movement, MNR (historical faction led by Víctor Paz Estenssoro) and
the Authentic Revolutionary Party, PRA (historical faction led by Wálter Guevara Arce).

It presented as its presidential candidate Paz Estenssoro and Guevara Arce as vice-presidential candidate.

Notes

1978 establishments in Bolivia
Centrist parties in South America
Defunct political party alliances in Bolivia
Political parties established in 1978
Political parties with year of disestablishment missing
Revolutionary Nationalist Movement